Kevin Anderson (born September 14, 1994) is an American football quarterback for the Arlington Renegades of the XFL. He played college football for Marshall before transferring to Fordham. He previously played for the Orlando Apollos of the Alliance of American Football (AAF), he also had brief stints with the Winnipeg Blue Bombers and Ottawa Redblacks of the Canadian Football League (CFL). He was a member of The Spring League's (TSL) 2021 season where he led the Conquerors to finish as North Division runner-ups.

While at Fordham, Anderson finished his career top-ten in touchdown passes, completions, completion percentage, and passing yards.

Early life and high school career
Anderson was born on September 14, 1994, in Boca Raton, Florida. He attended Boca Raton Community High School in Boca Raton. As a junior, he completed 123 of 254 pass attempts for 1,712 yards, eleven touchdowns, and nine interceptions. On the ground that year he ran 59 times for 107 yards and three touchdowns. As a senior he completed forty of 81 pass attempts for 509 yards, five touchdowns, and two interceptions before suffering a season-ending broken collarbone. He committed to Marshall University over FCS schools like Illinois State University and Jacksonville State University.

College career

Marshall
In 2013, Anderson hoped to battle for Marshall's backup spot, but by the Green/White Game Anderson had fallen to the fourth-string spot on the depth chart behind Gunnar Holcombe, Cole Garvin, and the starter Rakeem Cato whom he was competing with during the spring practices. After former James Madison quarterback Michael Birdsong announced his intent to transfer to Marshall and commitment from Chase Litton, Anderson announced he would transfer to Fordham University after not playing a single snap for the Thundering Herd.

Fordham
In 2014, Anderson appeared in four games for the Rams, only recording a stat against Georgetown. He rushed for a five-yard score to finish off the team's 52–7 win.

In 2015, Anderson started all twelve games for the Rams. He went 229 of 342 for 3,183 yards and 32 touchdowns. He also ran 158 times for 341 yards and a touchdown. He led the Patriot League in passing touchdowns, completion percentage, was second in the Patriot League in total offense per game and passing yards per game. He made his first collegiate start against Army where he went fifteen of 23 for 322 yards and a rushing touchdown in a 37–35 win. In a game against Columbia, Anderson would go 22 of thirty for 330 yards and a career high five touchdown passes in a 44–24 win to secure the Liberty Cup. After the game he would be named Patriot League Offensive Player of the Week, he would win another Offensive Player of the Week honors after throwing for five touchdowns again the next week against Monmouth. The team would go 9–3 on the season, including a playoff run where they would face Chattanooga. In that game Anderson would go 26 of forty for 329 yards and three touchdowns in a 20–50 losing effort to the Mocs.

In 2016, Anderson started ten games for the Rams. He went 201 of 325 for 2,724 yards and 27 touchdowns. He also ran for 255 yards and two scores. He once again led the Patriot League in touchdowns and was tenth in the FCS. He helped lead the Rams to be ranked twelfth in passing yards per game, tenth in total offense per game, and was seventh in the country in points responsible for per game. All of those marks were good enough to lead the Patriot League. In the season opener against Navy where he went 26 of 45 for 302 yards and one touchdown in the 16–52 loss. He had a career high 426 passing yards on 28 completions in 34 attempts against Holy Cross in a 54–14 win in the second to last game of the season for the Ram–Crusader Cup. In an 83–21 win over Elizabeth City State he went 18 of 28 for 225 yards and four touchdowns. He had a caeer high five touchdowns passes on twelve completions on eighteen attempts for 270 yards against Yale in a 44–37 nonleague win. Following that game Anderson was named Patriot League Offensive Player of the Week. The team finished the year 8–3 (5–1 in Patriot League), just missing out on a playoff appearance.

Statistics

Fordham records
Is top 12 in the following Fordham records:
Career records
 Tied-14th career 100-yard rushing games: 1
 3rd career 300-yard passing games: 9
 2nd career 200-yard passing games: 22
 4th career passing attempts: 912
 3rd in career passing completions: 580
 2nd career completion percentage: 63.6%
 3rd career passing yards: 7,663
 1st career passing touchdowns: 73
Season records
 12th passing attempts in a season: 342 (2015)
 Tied-8th pass completions in a season: 229 (2015)
 2nd completion percentage in a season: 67.0% (2015)
 10th completion percentage in a season: 61.8% (2016)
 11th completion percentage in a season: 61.2% (2017)
 4th passing yards in a season: 3,183 (2015)
 8th passing yards in a season: 2,724 (2016)
 2nd touchdown passes in a season: 32 (2015)
 Tied-4th touchdown passes in a season: 27 (2016)
Single game records
 3rd total passing yards in a game: 426 (2016)
 Tied-6th longest completion in a game: 87 (2015)

Professional career

Orlando Apollos
In 2019, Anderson was drafted by the Orlando Apollos of the Alliance of American Football (AAF) in the AAF QB Draft behind Garrett Gilbert, Stephen Morris, and Austin Appleby. He did not start any games for the Apollos but was named as an unofficial champion when the league suspended operations prior to the end of the season.

Winnipeg Blue Bombers
On August 28, 2019, Anderson was signed by the Winnipeg Blue Bombers of the Canadian Football League (CFL). He was released on September 18, 2019.

Ottawa Redblacks
On December 21, 2019, Anderson was signed by the Ottawa Redblacks. Following the cancelation of the 2020 season, he was released on August 31, 2020.

TSL Conquerors
On October 29, 2020, Anderson signed with the Conquerors of The Spring League (TSL). With the Conquerors, he went 59 of 103 for 682 yards, five touchdowns to no interceptions. In a 34–7 win over the Aviators, Anderson went twelve of seventeen for 171 yards and one touchdown, including a 36 yard pass to Vinny Papale. During his time with the Conquerors he split time with Brandon Silvers. The team finished second in the North Division as they went 4–2.

Arlington Renegades
On November 17, 2022, Anderson was assigned to the Arlington Renegades of the XFL following the 2023 XFL Draft. He joined Drew Plitt and Kyle Sloter.

Statistics

Personal life
Beginning when Anderson was in eighth grade he worked with former Marshall quarterback Eric Kresser.

References

External links
 Fordham Rams bio

1994 births
Living people
Sportspeople from Boca Raton, Florida
Players of American football from Florida
American football quarterbacks
Fordham Rams football players
Marshall Thundering Herd football players
Orlando Apollos players
Ottawa Redblacks players
Winnipeg Blue Bombers players
Arlington Renegades players
The Spring League players
Boca Raton Community High School alumni